John Metcalf represented Dedham, Massachusetts in the Great and General Court. He was also town clerk for a total of 16 years, having first been elected in 1731. Starting in 1716, he served 27 terms as selectman.

References

Works cited

Members of the colonial Massachusetts General Court from Dedham
Year of birth missing
Year of death missing
Dedham, Massachusetts selectmen
Dedham Town Clerks